"Midnight Surprise" is the second single from Lightspeed Champion's album Falling off the Lavender Bridge. The single was released on 10" vinyl by Domino Records. The full title to the song, which can be found on the CD sleeve is "Midnight Surprise (My Time Spent Down The Lavander Bridge / Oh God, Really? / She Said "I'm Starting To Lose It")"

Backing vocals were performed by regular collaborators Emmy The Great and members of Tilly And The Wall, as well as members of Son, Ambulance, and other musicians from Omaha, Nebraska, where the song was recorded with producer Mike Mogis.

The b-side to the single, "Flesh Failures (Let The Sunshine In)", is a cover of the track from the musical Hair.

There are two versions of the song; the shorter radio edit, and the almost ten-minute-long album version. Both versions have their own music videos.

Track listing

External links
Lightspeed Champion Official Site
"Midnight Surprise" video (3:23 minute edit)
Full-length version video of "Midnight Surprise"
Listing at Domino Records' site

References

2007 singles
Songs written by Dev Hynes
2007 songs
Domino Recording Company singles